The 57th Academy of Country Music Awards was held on March 7, 2022 at Allegiant Stadium in Paradise, Nevada. The show was hosted by ACM award winner Dolly Parton. Parton was joined by co-hosts, Jimmie Allen and Gabby Barrett. The ceremony was streamed live on Amazon Prime Video. In the main awards categories Miranda Lambert, Carly Pearce, Carrie Underwood, and Chris Young received the most nominations with four each.

Background
On August 19, 2021, the Academy of Country Music announced that they would be leaving their longtime partner CBS, after Amazon acquired the rights. This marked the first time a major awards show had been live streamed exclusively.

Winners and nominees
Nominations were announced on February 10, by Jimmie Allen and Gabby Barrett; the eligibility period for the nominations are January 1, 2021 through November 15, 2021.
{| class="wikitable"
! style="background:#EEDD85;" width="50%" |Entertainer of the Year
! style="background:#EEDD85;" width="50%" |Album of the Year
|-
| valign="top" |
 Miranda Lambert
 Eric Church
 Luke Combs
 Chris Stapleton
 Carrie Underwood
| valign="top" |
 Dangerous: The Double Album — Morgan Wallen
 29: Written in Stone — Carly Pearce
 Country Again: Side A — Thomas Rhett
 Famous Friends — Chris Young
 The Marfa Tapes —  Miranda Lambert, Jack Ingram, Jon Randall
|-
! style="background:#EEDD82; width=50%" |Female Artist of the Year
! style="background:#EEDD82; width=50%" |Male Artist of the Year
|-
| valign="top" |
 Carly Pearce
 Gabby Barrett
 Miranda Lambert
 Ashley McBryde
 Maren Morris
| valign="top" |
 Chris Stapleton
 Jimmie Allen
 Luke Combs
 Thomas Rhett
 Morgan Wallen
|-
! style="background:#EEDD82; width=50%" |Group of the Year
! style="background:#EEDD82; width=50%" |Duo of the Year
|-
| valign="top" |
 Old Dominion
 Lady A
 Little Big Town
 Midland
 The Cadillac Three
| valign="top" |
 Brothers Osborne
 Brooks & Dunn
 Dan + Shay
 LOCASH
 Maddie & Tae
|-
! style="background:#EEDD82; width=50%" |Single of the Year
! style="background:#EEDD82; width=50%" |Song of the Year
|-
| valign="top" |
 "If I Didn't Love You" — Jason Aldean and Carrie Underwood
 "Buy Dirt" — Jordan Davis and Luke Bryan
 "Famous Friends" — Chris Young and Kane Brown
 "Fancy Like" — Walker Hayes
 "You Should Probably Leave" — Chris Stapleton
| valign="top" |
 "Things a Man Oughta Know" — Jason Nix, Jonathan Singleton, Lainey Wilson
 "7 Summers" — Morgan Wallen, Josh Osborne, Shane McAnally
 "Buy Dirt" — Jordan Davis, Jacob Davis, Josh Jenkins, Matt Jenkins
 "Fancy Like" — Cameron Bartolini, Walker Hayes, Josh Jenkins, Shane Stevens
 "Knowing You" — Adam James, Brett James, Kat Higgins
|-
! style="background:#EEDD82; width=50%" |New Female Artist of the Year
! style="background:#EEDD82; width=50%" |New Male Artist of the Year
|-
| valign="top" |
 Lainey Wilson
 Tenille Arts
 Priscilla Block
 Lily Rose
 Caitlyn Smith
| valign="top" |
 Parker McCollum
 Hardy
 Walker Hayes
 Ryan Hurd
 Elvie Shane
|-
! style="background:#EEDD82; width=50%" |Songwriter of the Year
! style="background:#EEDD82; width=50%" |Video of the Year
|-
| valign="top" |
 Michael Hardy
 Jesse Frasure
 Nicolle Galyon
 Ashley Gorley
 Josh Osborne
| valign="top" |
  "Drunk (And I Don't Wanna Go Home)" — Elle King and Miranda Lambert "Famous Friends" — Chris Young and Kane Brown
 " I Bet You Think About Me (From The Vault) (Taylor's Version)" — Taylor Swift and Chris Stapleton
 "If I Didn't Love You" — Jason Aldean and Carrie Underwood
 "Never Wanted to Be That Girl" — Carly Pearce and Ashley McBryde
|-
! colspan="2" style="background:#EEDD82; width=50%" |Music Event of the Year
|-
| colspan="2" |
 "Never Wanted to Be That Girl" — Carly Pearce and Ashley McBryde "Buy Dirt" — Jordan Davis and Luke Bryan
 "Famous Friends" — Chris Young and Kane Brown
 "Half of My Hometown" — Kelsea Ballerini and Kenny Chesney
 "If I Didn't Love You" — Jason Aldean and Carrie Underwood
|}

PerformancesPre-show performances'''
 Tenille Townes — "When's It Gonna Happen"
 Kat & Alex — "I Want It All"

Presenters

 Tom Pelphrey and Guy Torry — Presented Duo and Group of the Year
 Jason Aldean — Introduced Chris Stapleton
 Luke Grimes and Kelsey Asbille — Presented Single and Song of the Year
 James Patterson — Introduced Dolly Parton and Kelsea Ballerini
 Derek Carr — Presented Album of the Year
 Mickey Guyton — Recognized ACM Lifting Lives and ACM's partnership with St. Jude Children's Research Hospital
 Alan Ritchson — Presented Male Artist and Female Artist of the Year
 Dolly Parton — Presented Entertainer of the Year

Milestones 

 Jimmie Allen became the third black male to be nominated for Male Artist of the Year (two others include Charley Pride and Darius Rucker).
 After winning Entertainer of the Year, Miranda Lambert qualified for the coveted Triple Crown Award (she was recognized at the 2022 ACM Honors).
 Ryan Hurd and Maren Morris were the first married couple to be nominated in the same year since Tim McGraw and Faith Hill in 2017.

References

Academy of Country Music Awards
Academy of Country Music Awards
Academy of Country Music Awards
2022 in Nevada
Academy of Country Music Awards